Khan Mahi is a town and union council in Charsadda District of Khyber-Pakhtunkhwa. It is located at 34°13'31N 71°52'27E and has an altitude of 309 metres (1017 feet).
In local bodies elections held in General Musharraf Era First Nazim of union council khanmahi was Dost Muhammad khan umaray and second and the last nazim was Saif Ullah Khan.

References

Union councils of Charsadda District
Populated places in Charsadda District, Pakistan